Mandanapis is a genus of South Pacific araneomorph spiders in the family Anapidae, containing the single species, Mandanapis cooki. It was  first described by Norman I. Platnick & Raymond Robert Forster in 1989, and has only been found on New Caledonia.

References

Anapidae
Monotypic Araneomorphae genera
Spiders of Oceania
Taxa named by Raymond Robert Forster